Jagga may refer to:

Chaga people, Bantu-speaking indigenous Africans
Jagga (film), a 1964 Indian Punjabi-language film

Persons
 Jagga Jatt (c. 1901–1931), Punjabi heroic rebel
 Jagga Reddy (born 1966), Indian politician

See also
Jagga Jasoos, 2017 Indian film by Anurag Basu
Jaga (disambiguation)
Jagger, a surname